The Port Huron Saints was the final moniker of the minor league baseball teams based in Port Huron, Michigan between 1883 and 1926.

Port Huron minor league teams played as members of the Michigan State League in 1890, 1895 and 1897, the International League in 1898 and 1900, the Border League from 1912 to 1913, the Michigan-Ontario League from 1921 to 1922 and 1926, with a final partial season in the 1926 Michigan State League.

History

1883 to 1900: Michigan State League / International League
Minor league baseball began in Port Huron, Michigan in 1883, with an Independent minor league team. No records for the 1883 team are known.

The Port Huron team resumed minor league play as members of the 1890 Michigan State League. After beginning play on May 19, 1890, the Independent level league folded on June 13, 1890. At the time the Independent level league folded, Port Huron had an 11–14 record and were in 4th place, playing under manager Joe Walsh. Port Huron ended the season 6.0 games behind the 1st place Grand Rapids Shamrocks.

Returning to Michigan State League play, the 1895 Port Huron Marines rejoined the Class B level league before folding during the season. On September 3, 1895, the Marines folded 27–51 record, playing under managers Boocher, Charles Schaub and Thomas Jenkinson. The Adrian Demons were the eventual league champions.

The 1897 Port Huron team joined the reformed six–team Class D level Michigan State League. The league folded on August 16, 1897. At the time the league folded, Port Huron was in 3rd place. Port Huron concluded the season with a 29–42 record. Playing under managers Gobel and D. McCarron, Port Huron finished 8.5 behind the 1st place Bay City team in the final standings.

The Port Huron Tigers continued play in 1898, joining a new League. The team was also called the "Braves" in 1898, joining the Independent level International League. The team finished in last place with a 24–30 record. Placing 6th in the six-team league, which ended play on July 8, 1888. Playing under manager John Murphy, the Tigers finished 14.5 games behind the 1st place Bay City Sugar Citys in the final standings.

The International League resumed play in 1900, with the Port Huron Tunnelites as a member. Rejoining the Independent level International League, Port Huron began playing home games at Recreation Park. Port Huron finished last in the league. Ending the season with a 12–29, Port Huron placed 6th in the six-team league. Playing under managers Pat Flaherty and  Bert Eltom, the Tunnelites finished 16.5 games behind the 1st place Hamilton Hams when the league stopped play on July 4, 1900.

1912 to 1926: Border League / International League / Michigan–Ontario league / Michigan State League

In 1912, Port Huron resumed minor league play. The Port Huron Independents became charter members of the Class D level Border League, which featured teams from both the United States and Canada. The 1912 five–team league featured the Mount Clemens Bathers, Pontiac Indians, Windsor and Wyandotte Alkalis joining the Independents in beginning league play.

The 1912 Port Huron Independents finished last in the Border League standings. Beginning league play on May 30, 1912, Port Huron ended the 1912 season with a record of 7–17 playing under manager Bill Brown. Port Huron finished 12.0 games behind the 1st place Wyandotte Alkalis (19–5), followed by the 2nd place Pontiac Indians (14–9), Windsor (9–14) and the Mount Clemens Bathers (11–15) in the final standings.

The Port Huron Independents continued play as members of the 1913 Class D level International league. Beginning play on May 24, 1913, the Port Huron Independents placed 3rd in  the Border League final standings. Port Huron ended the 1913 season with a 15–19 record as Bill Brown returned as manager. The Independents finished 9.0 games behind the 1st place Ypsilanti, Michigan team in the six–team league. The Border League permanently folded following the 1913 season.

Port Huron returned to minor league play in 1921. The Port Huron "Saints" became members of the eight–team Class B level Michigan–Ontario league, replacing the Battle Creek Custers franchise in the league. The team is also referred to as the Port Huron–Sarnia Saints referring to a partnership with neighboring Sarnia, Ontario, located just across the St. Clair River from Port Huron, Michigan. The Saints finished the 1921 season in 5th place. With a final record of 58–63, playing under managers James Pierce, Steve Harder and Ed Harter, Port Huron ended the season 15.5 games behind the 1st place London Tecumsehs in the standings. Port Huron did not qualify for the playoff won by the London Tecumsehs.

The Port Huron Saints continued play in the 1922 Michigan–Ontario league, again placing 5th in the final standings. Playing under manager Bill Kelly the Saints ended the season with a final record of 67–65. The Saints finished 16.5 games behind the 1st place Hamilton Tigers and id not qualify for the playoff won by Hamilton. Pitcher Richard Glazier of Port Huron–Sarnia led the league with an ERA of 1.31. The Saints franchise folded after the 1922 season and did not return to the Michigan-Ontario league in 1923.

The "Port Huron Saints" returned to play for a final season in 1926, playing in two leagues during the season and winning a championship. Port Huron began the 1926 season playing in the four–team Class B level Michigan–Ontario League, which reformed during the season. The Michigan–Ontario League stopped play on June 13, 1926, when the league merged with the Central League to form the new Michigan State League. The Michigan State League began play June 15, 1926. The Saints were in 1st place when the Michigan–Ontario League League dissolved on June 13, as Port Huron finished with a 20–10 record to claim the final Michigan–Ontario League championship, playing under manager Johnny Carlin and finishing 1.0 game ahead of the 2nd place Saginaw Aces. Resuming play in the newly formed eight–team Class B level Michigan State League, Port Huron finished in 2nd place with a 56–38 record, continuing play under manager Johnny Carlin and finishing 8.0 games ahead of the 1st place Bay City Wolves. The Michigan State League did not return to play in 1927.

Port Huron, Michigan has not hosted another minor league team.

The ballparks
In the 1890, 1895 and 1897 minor league seasons, Port Huron hosted home games at the Athletic Club Grounds.

In the 1900 season and also for select games in 1912 and 1913, Port Huron played minor league home games at Recreation Park. The site was also known as "Driving Park" and was located at Elmwood & 13 Street, Port Huron, Michigan.

Beginning in 1912, Port Huron played minor league home games at Watkins Field. First called "Athletic Park," the ballpark was later named for Port Huron native William H. Watkins, who was notably a major league manager and former Port Huron player. The ballpark was also utilized by Port Huron High School. The ballpark no longer exists and was located at 24th Street & Moak Street, Port Huron, Michigan.

Timeline

Year-by-year records

Notable alumni

Louis Brower (1926)
Ed Bruyette (1900)
Bunk Congalton (1895)
Pat Flaherty (1900, MGR)
Emil Frisk (1898)
Shorty Gallagher (1900)
Norman Glaser (1922)
Frank Griffity (1895)
Frank Harris (1800)
Bill Harper (1912)
Trader Horne (1921–1922)
Ralph Judd (1922)
Red Long (1900)
Jon Morrison (1890)
Fred O'Neill (1890)
Frank Quinn (1898)
Fred Schemanske (1922)
Vern Spencer (1913)
Joe Walsh (1912)
Bill Watkins (1883)
Clarence Winters (1921–1922)

See also
Port Huron (minor league baseball) players
Port Huron Independents players
Port Huron Marines players
Port Huron Saints players
Port Huron Tigers players
Port Huron Tunnelites players

References

External links
 Baseball Reference

Defunct minor league baseball teams
Defunct baseball teams in Michigan
Baseball teams established in 1921
Baseball teams disestablished in 1926
Michigan State League teams
Michigan-Ontario League teams